Madonna and Child with Eight Saints is an oil painting on canvas of  by Bramantino, originally in the church of Santa Maria del Giardino in Milan and now in the Contini Bonacossi collection at the Uffizi in Florence. It belongs to the sacra conversazione genre.

Few of the saints hold attributes, making it difficult to identify them, though they might include John the Baptist (kneeling at the left and gesturing towards the Christ Child), Job or Saint Jerome (the bearded man with a bare torso), possibly Saint Ambrose (the bishop saint to the right) and Saint George or Saint Sebastian (the warrior saint with a long sword). An unknown monk saint is also shown.

References

1520 paintings
Paintings by Bramantino
Paintings in the collection of the Uffizi
Paintings depicting John the Baptist
Paintings of the Madonna and Child